The Communist Unity Contact Forum Nepal was a Nepalese communist organisation. It was founded in July 1974 by communists who had developed differences with the Communist Party of Nepal (Pushpa Lal).  The group was based in western Nepal and in exile in India. The organisation published Rato Jhanda ('Red Flag'). The ideology of the group was Marxism–Leninism-Mao Zedong Thought, and it worked for the creation of a militant and well-organised communist party. The group accused Manmohan Adhikari, Pushpa Lal Shrestha and Mohan Bikram Singh for factionalism.

The group was reorganised as the Proletarian Revolutionary Organisation, Nepal in 1976. In 1977 the group made a new analysis, and adopted the theory of Boddhisatva Maoism. It claimed that the thoughts of Buddha and Mao Zedong were proponents of the same line of thinking, and that it was necessary to add Buddhist thinking to Mao's doctrine in order to advance the revolutionary cause in the Nepalese context. Moreover, it claimed that Buddhism would be unable to receive nationwide respect in Nepal if Mao's thinking was not harmonized into the Buddhist thinking.

However, the concept of Bodhisattva Maoism was too difficult for many of the members of the organisation to digest. In 1978 internal dissent broke out inside the organisation, and the group would soon disappear from the political scene. The remainders of the group merged into the Nepal Workers Peasants Organisation.

See also
Buddhist socialism

References

Maoist organisations in Nepal
Defunct communist parties in Nepal
Political parties established in 1974
Political parties disestablished in 1978
Buddhist socialism
1974 establishments in Nepal
1978 disestablishments in Nepal